The Chichester Canal is a ship canal in England, currently navigable at either end, save for two low-level modern bridges obstructing the middle of the route. Its course is essentially intact,  from the sea at Birdham on Chichester Harbour to Chichester through two locks. The canal (originally part of the Portsmouth and Arundel Canal) was opened in 1822 and took three years to build. As denoted by the suffix -chester, Chichester is a Roman settlement (Noviomagus Reginorum), and 300 Denarii were unearthed when Chichester Basin was formed in the 1820s.

History

Planning, construction and early operation

Proposals for a canal linking Chichester directly to the sea go back as least as far as 1585 when an act of parliament was passed allowing a cut linking Chichester with the sea. Further proposals were made in the early 19th century, with schemes being proposed in 1801, 1802, 1803 and 1811, but none of these came to pass and as a result the first link to the sea was via a branch of the Portsmouth and Arundel Canal opened in 1822. In 1817 it had been decided that the section between Chichester and Chichester Harbour, unlike the rest of the canal, would be built large enough to carry boats of 100 tons. Putting this into practice required a new act of parliament which was obtained in 1819. In the same year the construction of the Chichester branch began. In digging out of the basin a hoard of 300 Denarii was found. The section of the canal that would become the Chichester Canal was formally opened on 9 April 1822

The Portsmouth and Arundel Canal was conceived as part of a bigger plan to provide a secure inland canal route from London to Portsmouth, but by the time the route was completed, the war with France had ended. With the reason for its construction removed, the canal was not a commercial success, and apart from the Chichester section, it had fallen into disuse by 1847.

Under the ownership of the Corporation of Chichester
The canal was transferred to the Corporation of Chichester in 1892. In November of that year the City Surveyor gave a figure of £1000 to put the canal back into full working order; key tasks were repair of locks, bridges and the removal of weeds and mud from the channel. By 1898 only 704 tons of goods were carried – tolls for the year were £18. The last recorded commercial traffic was in 1906 when a load of shingle was carried from the Harbour to the basin. In the same year it was found that the swing bridge at Donnington and Birdham needed to be repaired or replaced. Westhampnett Rural District Council wanted to replace them with fixed bridges (which would have blocked the canal) but the Corporation of Chichester wanted to keep the canal open to traffic. By 1923 the Corporation appears to have accepted that there would be no further great loads; it authorised and funded fixed bridges.

The canal was officially open for trade until June 1928 before being formally abandoned.

In 1932 the section of the canal between Cutfield Bridge and Salterns lock was reopened to allow yachts to be berthed there. The open section was initially leased by D.S. Vernon but in 1934 he transferred it to the Chichester Yacht Company.

World War II
In Britain in World War II the canal towpath was made an anti-tank and anti-barge route by the 4th Infantry Division (United Kingdom) to militate against a German invasion. The partial diversion proved hard to control and the fluctuations damaged the canal and a houseboat; argument as to the duty to compensate lasted until June 1947.

Post war

In 1953 the canal and surrounding lands were sold to West Sussex County Council for £7,500. The council let plans be known to use part of the canal for road improvement, on opposition and with higher priority issues for funds, these never took place. The section below Cutfield Bridge continued to be leased to the Chichester Yacht Company while the upper part of the canal was leased to Chichester Canal Angling Association.

In January 1994 floodwaters in lower Chichester were diverted into the canal.

A 2009 restoration of Casher's Lock was halted due to the presence of water voles. This is not necessarily an insurmountable obstacle; see ecology work on the Stroudwater Navigation, where in partnership with Gloucestershire Wildlife Trust, new wetland habitats alongside canal construction are helping to extend the range of endangered species. 

As of 2021 the sea lock is no longer in working order and is beginning to collapse at the harbour end.

Points of interest

See also

Canals of the United Kingdom
History of the British canal system

Bibliography

References

External links

The website of the  Chichester Ship Canal Trust

Canals in England
Canals in West Sussex
History of West Sussex
Transport in West Sussex
Chichester
Canals opened in 1822
1822 establishments in England